Mary Violet Graeme (1875-1951) was a Scottish born English international badminton player.

Badminton career
Mary born in 1875 was a winner of the All England Open Badminton Championships. She won the women's 1899 All England Badminton Championships doubles.

References

English female badminton players
1875 births
1951 deaths